Caranfil is a surname. Notable people with the surname include: 

Gheorghe Caranfil, Romanian fencer
Nae Caranfil (born 1960), Romanian film director and screenwriter
Nicolae Caranfil, Romanian fencer
Tudor Caranfil (1931-2019), Romanian film critic

Romanian-language surnames